The Hupmobile Building is located at 2523 Farnam Street in Midtown Omaha, Nebraska. Built in 1917 on the city's historic Auto Row, the building was an early Hupmobile dealership.  It was listed on the National Register of Historic Places in 2014.

The building was built as a dealership, service shop, and factory branch for Hupmobile.  In 1925, the Hupmobile dealership was moved to a larger building at 20th and Harney Streets.  The Farnam Street building was used by several other automobile dealerships until 1940, selling brands including Hudson, Willys Knight, and Terraplane. The building housed a flight school from 1941-1943, and the Sterling Manufacturing Company 1943-2003.  Sterling produced coffins, ship parts, and water heaters during World War II.

See also
Hupmobile Dealership (Washington, D.C.)
Lincoln Highway (Omaha)

References

Commercial buildings completed in 1917
History of Midtown Omaha, Nebraska
Buildings and structures in Omaha, Nebraska
Hupmobile
Auto dealerships on the National Register of Historic Places
National Register of Historic Places in Omaha, Nebraska
Commercial buildings on the National Register of Historic Places in Nebraska
Transportation buildings and structures on the National Register of Historic Places in Nebraska